

Films

1965 in LGBT history
LGBT
1965
1965